Russel Hobbs is a fictional American musician and member of the British virtual band Gorillaz. He provides the drums and percussion for the band. Like all the other Gorillaz band members, he was created by Damon Albarn and Jamie Hewlett in 1998 and made his first official appearance in Gorillaz' debut EP Tomorrow Comes Today in 2000. Russel's spoken voice is supplied by Remi Kabaka Jr., who joined Gorillaz in an official capacity on actual percussion in 2016.

Development

Characterization
Russel Hobbs was originally conceptualized by Jamie Hewlett and Damon Albarn in 1998 as a metafictional representation of the hip hop aspects of Gorillaz, embodying the spirit of the bands' collaborations with various rappers over the years. He is referenced in the lyrics to the Gorillaz track "Clint Eastwood". He was originally inspired by Hewlett's love for hip hop artists like Ice Cube (the cousin of rapper Del the Funky Homosapien, who raps on "Clint Eastwood" and "Rock The House" as Del the Ghost Rapper). Russel's speaking voice is provided by drummer and DJ Remi Kabaka Jr., who has been an actual drummer and producer for Gorillaz since Humanz in 2017. Russel's fictional backstory of being possessed by the spirits of dead musicians is what originally inspired the usage of collaborators and guests on Gorillaz' albums.

Fictional history
Russel was born on 3 June 1975 in Brooklyn, New York, United States.

Originally from Brooklyn, Russel has experienced paranormal activity since his childhood. His first encounter with the supernatural occurred when he was just four years old. One winter night while on the way home to Brooklyn from Harlem with his parents, an ominous figure suddenly emerged from the shadows and his parents froze as the figure approached Russel with a cryptic statement about dancing with the Devil. During this encounter, Russel heard the Miles Davis song "It Never Entered My Mind" playing. Terrified, Russel closed his eyes and held tightly onto his blanket, and once he opened them, everything appeared to be back to normal, and he was with his parents on a train back home. Russel speculates that this may have been his first encounter with the Grim Reaper, who he would encounter multiple times later in his life. He wouldn't experience a supernatural event again until years later at the Xavier School for Young Achievers after being possessed by a demon and defending himself from a student who attacked him with a sword. The priest who exorcised the demon from Russel while he was in a coma recommended him to Brooklyn High School, which is where Russel's love for hip hop began. At some point, Russel and his friends were shot and killed in a drive-by shooting that took place one night outside of a 7-Eleven store, and all of their souls subsequently possessed his body. The Grim Reaper was also present during this event. After the drive-by took place, Russel was moved to the Belsize Park in London to live with his uncle for his own safety. While waiting at the airport for his flight to London, the same Miles Davis song that he heard during his encounter with the ominous figure as a child was playing over the loudspeakers.

Russel became a member of Gorillaz after being kidnapped by bassist Murdoc Niccals and taken away to the newly bought Kong Studios while working at a record store called Big Rick Black's Record Shop in Soho, London. Initially resistant, Russel decided to stay after being impressed by the music that was playing at the studio. He then became a member of Gorillaz shortly thereafter, taking on the role of the band's drummer.

After Russel and the rest of Gorillaz parted ways in 2003, all of the souls that possessed Russel were exorcised from his body by the Grim Reaper, including Del the Ghost Rapper. Following this event, Russel moved into the basement of Demon Days collaborator Ike Turner while experiencing a mental breakdown. During his stay at Turner's, he attempted to make a solo record with a working title of "The Seventh Heaven Hip-Hop and Harmony", but production was eventually halted after the album became affected by paranormal activity. After this, Noodle's demos for Demon Days were beginning to become complete, and Russel was called in to contribute his drumming to the record. After the completion and release of Demon Days and its worldwide success, Russel departed from the group in a panic when Noodle was presumed dead and in Hell following the events of the music video for "El Mañana" in fear that he would be next. Russel then went on a journey to confront his inner demons and was absent for Gorillaz' live performance at the Apollo Theater.

After learning that Murdoc made Gorillaz' third album without him and replaced him with a drum machine, he went on a journey across the ocean to find the band. During this journey, he became the size of a giant after consuming the contaminated material contained in the ocean. He is shown arriving on Plastic Beach with Noodle in the storyboard for the scrapped "Rhinestone Eyes" music video, after finding her in the music video for "On Melancholy Hill". After Plastic Beach was destroyed by the Black Clouds, Russel and Noodle swam away to an unknown location. Russel had little-to-no spoken dialogue in the Plastic Beach era of Gorillaz.

In Gorillaz' 2016 interactive short story "The Book of Russel", it was revealed that after the events at Plastic Beach, Russel was mistaken for a whale and was harpooned off the coast of Japan. He managed to get away, but lost Noodle in the process. Russel was then captured by the North Korean government and declared a Pulgasari, becoming an attraction at a North Korean amusement park. North Korea's food rations eventually caused Russel to shrink back to his normal size and he's stayed mostly normal sized ever since. Following this, he was sent back to England, where he stayed at Gorillaz collaborator Jeff Wootton's house before they were both contacted by Murdoc and told the band were getting back together. After the Humanz campaign ended, Russel hosted a podcast for Deezer in 2018 called "Gorillaz: Things I Like", where he interviewed various Humanz collaborators.

On 4 October 2019, Russel sent out a postcard to the band from Mexico while they were all on vacation in different areas across the world. He mentioned that he had recently started his own hot sauce business called Hobbs Hot Sauce and was hoping to see them soon, making reference to parts of a machine that the band were gathering that would later be revealed as the Song Machine, the latest audiovisual project from Gorillaz. In Song Machine, Russel is the one responsible for gathering most of the artists to and from Kong Studios through its portals, as he did with 6lack in "The Pink Phantom". On 12 November 2020, Gorillaz announced that they were selling an official Hobbs Hot Sauce set made in collaboration with the hot sauce brand Barnfathers.

Physical appearance
Russel is a heavy set African American character known for his large size and considerable weight. His height is 5 feet 9 inches tall, or 1.75 meters. According to an episode of MTV Cribs featuring Gorillaz, Russel is revealed to weigh 340 lbs, or 145.5 kg. In Plastic Beach, he grew to be the size of a giant after consuming radioactive material in the ocean. In Gorillaz' 2016 interactive short story "The Book of Russel", it was revealed that Russel shrunk back to his regular size while in North Korea due to the country's meager food rations and he has been normal sized ever since. His eyes are a completely milky white color and have no visible pupils due to being possessed by spirits. He is often depicted wearing a fez hat, with the first appearance of this being in the music video for "Dirty Harry" in 2005. He is also sometimes designed wearing an eyepatch or a visor. As with all of the Gorillaz members, Russel has been shown to get older with the release of each new Gorillaz project. Originally in his mid-to-late 20s when Gorillaz was first released, Russel is now in his 40s. He has also been designed in many different outfits throughout the years and his clothes change regularly, unlike most cartoon characters.

Personality
Russel is wise and intelligent, with a wide range of knowledge about many subjects, especially music. He is said to have once engineered his own device called the Hip-hop machine, a drum machine that is said to be able to play every beat known to man. He is respectful and articulate, with an extensive vocabulary and good manners. He is loyal and has been shown to hate disloyalty from others. This is evident in his friendship with his bandmate Murdoc, whom Russel has physically assaulted multiple times for backstabbing Gorillaz frontman 2-D. Russel has been shown to be highly protective of those he cares about, especially 2-D and Noodle, although he has shown a dislike for Murdoc. He is generally cool, calm and collected, but has also shown a pattern of mental health issues and has displayed a high tendency to exhibit paranoia, experiencing many mental breakdowns throughout his life. He is passionate about social justice and human rights, sometimes reflecting on issues that affect the oppressed and disenfranchised. The wardrobe that Russel wore in Humanz was inspired by that of the Black Panther Party and the Sandinista National Liberation Front. Russel has been hinted at as being an associate of the African-American centered religious movement The Nation of Islam. He has listed the Nation of Islam leader Louis Farrakhan as an influence in interviews and spoken highly of Malcolm X. He has also been shown wearing various fezzes, which has historically been considered a symbol of devotion to Islam.

Russel is often shown sleeping or entranced in Gorillaz videos. In the G-Bite short "Jump The Gut", Russel is shown as asleep in the middle of the road. At the end of the music video for "DoYaThing", he is shown as sleeping on the rooftop of the band's apartment. In the music video for "Saturnz Barz", Russel attempts to fall asleep in a room in the Spirit House before being awakened by ghosts. In "Strobelite", Russel is shown sleeping on the couch at the beginning of the video. Russel is usually depicted as dazed and enchanted when drumming, especially when a spirit inside of him has been channeled. This happens in the music videos for "Clint Eastwood" and "Rock the House".

In Demon Days, Russel was portrayed as being a taxidermist, often shown with dead animals by his side in many images from this era. He briefly appeared in 2-D and Murdoc's 2017 interview with Telekom Electronic Beats through a phone call in which he makes accusatory claims towards 2-D and Murdoc. Russel has also shown an interest in conspiracy theories. In the music video for "Saturnz Barz", he wears a shirt with the phrase "It's Not Raël", in reference to the ancient astronaut theory religion of Raëlism. In an episode of the "Gorillaz: Things I Like" podcast, Russel discusses aliens and extraterrestrial beings with Gorillaz collaborator Peven Everett.

Russel speaks in a Brooklyn accent and frequently uses hip-hop lingo. He sometimes involuntarily slips into a very mild British accent and has used British slang, as a result of the amount of time he's spent as a citizen of London. Co-creator Jamie Hewlett originally envisioned Russel as having a much stronger British accent, but this was discouraged by co-creator Damon Albarn, who wanted him to speak in an American accent in order to better appeal to American audiences. His voice is low, deep, and soft, and he seldom raises his tone unless it is necessary.

Role in Gorillaz
Russel is Gorillaz' drummer. He (and the rest of Gorillaz) can play other instruments, but he usually sticks to percussion. He was not present for the recording of the album Plastic Beach, with Murdoc replacing him with a drum machine for the album. He has been the in-universe selector of the collaborators for the band since Humanz in 2017. The spirit of his dead friend Del the Ghost Rapper was channeled for the Gorillaz debut album tracks "Clint Eastwood" and "Rock The House". Originally, "Clint Eastwood" featured the English rap group Phi Life Cypher, also portrayed in the song as beings inside Russel.

Creators Damon Albarn and Jamie Hewlett have attributed him to being the sole band member responsible for the Gorillaz remix of Redman's "Let's Get Dirty (I Can't Get in da Club)". In Rise of the Ogre, he is also said to be the sole musician behind the production of the G-Sides track "The Sounder". Gorillaz' self-titled debut album's creative process has been stated by 2-D as being led by Russel.

Other appearances 
Russel and the rest of Gorillaz appear in the back cover of Jamie Hewlett's 2017 art book alongside characters from Hewlett's other projects.

References

Animated characters introduced in 1998
Animated human characters
Black characters in animation
Fictional African-American people
Fictional characters from Brooklyn
Fictional giants
Fictional inventors
Fictional mutants
Fictional rock musicians
Fictional sole survivors
Gorillaz members
Male characters in animation
Fictional characters invented for recorded music